Defense Electronics (formerly RF Design) is a Penton Media trade magazine that covers radio frequency design.

RF Design was started in 1978  and was published by Penton Media on a quarterly basis.

References

External links
http://defenseelectronicsmag.com/

Business magazines published in the United States
Electrical and electronic engineering magazines
Engineering magazines
Magazines established in 1978
Magazines published in Tennessee
Professional and trade magazines
Quarterly magazines published in the United States